Merle Boucher (born July 19, 1946) is a North Dakota Democratic-NPL Party politician who served in the North Dakota House of Representatives, representing the 9th district from 1991 to 2011. He served as Minority Leader from 1996 to 2011.

Boucher sought and lost the Democratic-NPL nomination for governor in 2004 and in 2008, but became the running mate of 2008 nominee Tim Mathern, running on the ticket as the nominee for lieutenant governor. Two years after that ticket lost, Boucher became the Democratic-NPL nominee for North Dakota Agriculture Commissioner, losing in the 2010 election to incumbent Doug Goehring.

Boucher is from  Rolette County, North Dakota and attended high school there. He went on to college, taking classes from the State School of Forestry. He then transferred to Mayville State University, where he graduated with a teaching degree in 1970.

He returned to Rolette and taught at the high school for 20 years.  After retiring, he became a rancher.  He holds his family's original Homestead Act claim among other land. He has coached the Rolette American Legion baseball team in past years.

External links
Representative Merle Boucher, Minority Leader in the North Dakota Legislative Assembly
Project Vote Smart - Representative Merle Boucher (ND) profile
Follow the Money - Merle Boucher
20062002 1998 campaign contributions

1946 births
Living people
People from Rolette County, North Dakota
Mayville State University alumni
Candidates in the 2008 United States elections
Candidates in the 2010 United States elections
21st-century American politicians
Ranchers from North Dakota
Democratic Party members of the North Dakota House of Representatives